The grey-sided laughingthrush (Pterorhinus caerulatus) is a species of passerine bird in the family Leiothrichidae.

This species was formerly placed in the genus Garrulax but following the publication of a comprehensive molecular phylogenetic study in 2018, it was moved to the resurrected genus Pterorhinus.

It is found in Bhutan, China, India, Myanmar, Nepal, and the Hawaiian Islands (where it was introduced). Its natural habitat is subtropical or tropical moist montane forests.

References

grey-sided laughingthrush
Birds of Eastern Himalaya
Birds of Tibet
Birds of Yunnan
grey-sided laughingthrush
Taxonomy articles created by Polbot
Taxobox binomials not recognized by IUCN